Bandstand Busking is a project based in London, England showcasing musicians on some of the city's underused bandstands. The sessions are recorded and shown for viewing on the Bandstand Busking website and YouTube channel. The first session was recorded in March 2008 with the artist Stars of Sunday League; dozens of acts have since performed in bandstands for the project, including local bands such as Fanfarlo and Alessi's Ark and some from further afield such as Of Montreal and Black Lips.

Initially the performances were recorded without an audience, but at the beginning of 2009 the time and location of forthcoming gigs started to be announced on the website.

The event developed into a monthly show at the bandstand in the Northampton Square in Islington. It has not taken place since May 2018, and the project has not been active since August of that year.

Artists (partial list) 
 Stars of Sunday League
 School of Language
 The Week That Was
 Wet Paint
 Johnny Flynn
 Wild Beasts
 David Karsten Daniels
 Laura Groves
 Frightened Rabbit (solo)
 The Wave Pictures
 Broadcast 2000
 The Acorn
 We Were Promised Jetpacks
 Of Montreal
 The Barker Band
 Tap Tap
 Nat Johnson
 Hatchie
 Chris Bathgate
 Paul Marshall
 Left With Pictures
 Tom Brosseau
 The Twilight Sad
 Asobi Seksu
 Psapp
 Loney Dear
 The Leisure Society
 Emmy the Great
 Esser
 Gregory and the Hawk
 Speech Debelle
 Black Lips
 Alessi's Ark
 The Hours
 Hauschka
 Wildbirds & Peacedrums
 Slow Club
 Brakes
 Theoretical Girl
 Fanfarlo
 Kill It Kid
 Lulu and the Lampshades

References

External links
 

Culture in London